Many of the national sports teams of New Zealand have been given nicknames, officially or otherwise, based on the iconic status of the All Blacks rugby team, and (mostly in the case of female teams) the silver tree fern (Cyathea dealbata) of their logo. The practice became controversial when Badminton New Zealand used the name "Black Cocks" for a period in 2004.

Teams

References

All Blacks, New Zealand national team nomenclature based on the
All Blacks, New Zealand national team nomenclature based on the
New Zealand national rugby union team
Sports culture in New Zealand
All Blacks, New Zealand national team nomenclature based on the